Rowland George Allanson Allanson-Winn, 5th Baron Headley (19 January 1855 – 22 June 1935), also known as Shaikh Rahmatullah al-Farooq, was an Irish peer and a prominent convert to Islam, who was also one of the leading members of the Woking Muslim Mission alongside Khwaja Kamal-ud-Din. He also presided over the British Muslim Society for some time.

Biography

Rowland George Allanson Allanson-Winn was born in London and educated at Westminster School and Trinity College, Cambridge University. He then entered Middle Temple, before commencing studies at King's College London. He subsequently became a civil engineer by profession, a builder of roads in India, and an authority on the protection of intertidal zones.

He was an enthusiastic practitioner of boxing as well as other arts of self-defence, and in 1890 co-authored, with C. Phillipps-Wolley, the classic Broad-sword and Singlestick (1890). He was solo author of Boxing (1889) in the same "All-England Series" (introduced by the boxer Bat Mullins) which was reprinted in 2006. In 1899 he married Teresa Johnson, daughter of William H. Johnson, former Wazir-wazirat (governor) of Ladakh (Jammu and Kashmir), India. She died in 1919.

Headley converted to Islam on 16 November 1913 and adopted the Muslim name of Shaikh Rahmatullah al-Farooq. In 1914 he established the British Muslim Society. He was the author of several books on Islam, including A Western Awakening to Islam (1914) and Three Great Prophets of the World. He was a widely travelled man and twice performed the Hajj.

He inherited his peerage from his cousin in 1913. In 1921 he married the Australian author Barbara Baynton. He became bankrupt in 1922. He was offered the throne of Albania in 1925, along with $500,000 and $50,000 per year but refused it, at which point Lady Headley returned to Melbourne, where she died in 1929. From 1929 Headley owned and lived at Ashton Gifford House near the village of Codford in Wiltshire. His widow Lady Catherine Headley continued to live at the property until 1940. He is buried in the Muslim section of Brookwood Cemetery.

Armenian genocide stance
Baron Headley alleged that the Armenian genocide was a case of both sides, Turks, and Armenians, killing each other and that the Turks were more numerous as victims than the Armenians. He was wrong and said this due to the Turks being Muslim and the Armenians being Christian.

See also 
Sir Charles Edward Archibald Watkin Hamilton, 5th Baronet
Henry Stanley, 3rd Baron Stanley of Alderley
William Abdullah Quilliam
Marmaduke Pickthall
Faris Glubb
Timothy Winter
Robert Reschid Stanley

References

Work cited

Further reading

External links
 Full details of the life, activities and writings of Headley
 

1855 births
1935 deaths
People educated at Westminster School, London
Alumni of Trinity College, Cambridge
Alumni of King's College London
Barons in the Peerage of Ireland
Converts to Islam
Burials at Brookwood Cemetery
English Muslims
British Ahmadis